Cisalpin (French, derived from Latin - this side of the Alps, i.e. the Italian side of the Alps) may mean:

 Cisalpin, a typeface designed by Swiss typographer Felix Arnold for use in cartography
 The Cisalpin (train), which ran between Paris and Milan
 French ship Nestor (1793), which was renamed Cisalpin in 1797

See also
 Cisalpine (disambiguation)
 Cisalpino
 Cisalpinism, a view in the Roman Catholic Church about the extent of papal authority